László Filep (6 December 1941 Császló – 19 November 2004 Budapest) was a Hungarian mathematician who specialized in history of mathematics. His Ph.D. advisors at the University of Debrecen were Barna Szénássy and Lajos Tamássy.

Selected publications

Books
 Queen of the sciences (Development of mathematics)
 Game theory
 The history of number writing

References

External links
 In memoriam László Filep

1941 births
2004 deaths
University of Debrecen alumni
20th-century Hungarian mathematicians
21st-century Hungarian mathematicians
Historians of mathematics
People from Szabolcs-Szatmár-Bereg County